Aptakisic is an unincorporated community in Lake County, Illinois, United States. Aptakisic is located along Aptakisic Road and the Canadian National Railway; it borders Buffalo Grove to the west and Lincolnshire to the east.

References

Unincorporated communities in Illinois
Chicago metropolitan area
Unincorporated communities in Lake County, Illinois